Zapadny is a rural locality (a settlement) in Ponomaryovsky Selsoviet, Ust-Kalmansky District, Altai Krai, Russia. The population was 50 as of 2013. There are 2 streets.

Geography 
Zapadny is located 32 km west of Ust-Kalmanka (the district's administrative centre) by road. Ponomaryovo is the nearest rural locality.

References 

Rural localities in Ust-Kalmansky District